Ivakin is a Russian masculine surname, its feminine counterpart is Ivakina. It may refer to
Anatoliy Ivakin (born 1955), Russian physicist-acoustician
Anton Ivakin (born 1991), Russian pole vaulter
Valentin Ivakin (1930–2010), Russian football goalkeeper and manager
Yaroslav Ivakin (born 1998), Russian football player
 Yekaterina Ivakina (born 1964), Russian javelin thrower

Russian-language surnames